Khalifehlu may refer to various places in Iran:
 Khalifehlu, Meshgin Shahr, Ardabil Province
 Khalifehlu, Namin, Ardabil Province
 Khalifehlu, Ahar, East Azerbaijan Province
 Khalifehlu, Meyaneh, East Azerbaijan Province
 Khalifehlu, West Azerbaijan
 Khalifehlu, Abhar, Zanjan Province
 Khalifehlu, Khodabandeh, Zanjan Province
 Khalifehlu, Khorramdarreh, Zanjan Province